CIKR may refer to:
CIKR-FM, "K-Rock 105.7", a radio station in Kingston, Ontario, Canada
Critical Infrastructure and Key Resources, part of the United States National Response Framework